Many songs in Indian films are based on ragas of Indian classical music. This song list includes those that are primarily set to the given raga, without major deviation from the musical scale.

The list

References 

Filmi
Indian songs

India music-related lists